John Christopher Courtenay Stevens (born 23 May 1955) is a British politician.  A Conservative Member of the European Parliament (MEP) from 1989 to 1999, he contested the Buckingham constituency in the 2010 general election as an independent, against Commons speaker John Bercow and came second with 10,331 votes (21.4%) compared to Bercow's 22,860 (47.3%).

Background
Stevens was educated at Winchester, where he won the Boxing Cup, and at Magdalen College, Oxford, taking a third class honours degree in law.  He then worked as a foreign exchange and bond trader for Morgan Grenfell.

He was the Conservative Member of the European Parliament (MEP) for Thames Valley from 1989 to 1999, before leaving the party in protest over its increasingly Eurosceptic positioning.  He then co-founded, along with Brendan Donnelly, the Pro-Euro Conservative Party (PECP) in that year. He contested the 1999 Kensington and Chelsea by-election for the PECP and came fourth.

The PECP was wound up in 2001 and Stevens joined the Liberal Democrats. He left the party in 2010 to stand in the 2010 general election against the Commons Speaker, John Bercow, and the leader of the UK Independence Party, Nigel Farage, in Buckingham. He stood for the Rejoin EU party at the 2021 London Assembly election.

References

External links

Buckingham Campaign For Democracy

1955 births
Living people
Conservative Party (UK) MEPs
Alumni of Magdalen College, Oxford
People educated at Winchester College
MEPs for England 1989–1994
MEPs for England 1994–1999
Pro-Euro Conservative Party MEPs
Liberal Democrats (UK) politicians
Politicians of the Pro-Euro Conservative Party
British political party founders